Live at the Hotel Seville is a live album recorded by the folk rock group, the Lovin' Spoonful at the Hotel Seville in Harrison Arkansas.  It was released on November 2, 1999, on the Varèse Sarabande label.

Musicians
Joe Butler - vocals, guitars, autoharp, percussion
Jerry Yester - guitars, vocals
Lena Yester - keyboards, vocals
Steve Boone - bass
Mike Arturi - drums

Track listing
 You Didn't Have to Be So Nice	
 Never Goin' Back 	
 Nashville Cats 	
 Fishin' Blues 	
 Jugband Music 	
 Younger Girl 	
 Full Measure 	
 Didn't Want To Have To Do It 	
 Did You Ever Have to Make Up Your Mind?	
 Six O'Clock 	
 Daydream 	
 Summer in the City	
 Do You Believe In Magic 	
 Henry Thomas 	
 Don't You Just Know It

References

1999 live albums
The Lovin' Spoonful albums